Wheeler (also known as Wheeler Station) is an unincorporated community in Lawrence County, Alabama, United States.  Wheeler had a post office at one time, but it no longer exists.  Wheeler has two sites on the National Register of Historic Places, the Tidewater-type cottage known as Bride's Hill and the former home of Joseph Wheeler, Pond Spring.

Demographics

Wheeler Station appeared on the 1880 U.S. Census as an unincorporated community of 114 residents. This was the only time it appeared on census records.

Geography

References

Unincorporated communities in Alabama
Unincorporated communities in Lawrence County, Alabama